Panasonic Lumix DMC-G6 is a Micro Four Thirds system camera made by Panasonic Lumix. The model was announced in April 2013. The highest-resolution pictures it can record is 16.05 megapixels and the sensor is a Live MOS The camera is not a direct replacement of the Panasonic Lumix DMC-G5, but set in between the G5 and the Panasonic Lumix DMC-GH3.

The body only dimension of Lumix G6 is relatively same with the smallest and lightest model of DSLR with an APS-C sensor Canon EOS 100D, but certainly Lumix G6 has smaller lenses. Lumix G6 has also built-in Panorama mode, focus-peaking for video as videocam, interval shooting, time lapse movies, while Canon EOS 100D has not.

Properties
16,05 Megapixel Live MOS sensor
Venus Engine
Fast Light Speed AF
OLED LVF (Live View Finder)
Wi-Fi and NFC for Smartphones
Creative Panorama and Creative Control with 19 filters

Successor 
The Panasonic G7 was announced on May 18, 2015. The camera features 16 MP Live MOS Sensor in combination with Venus Engine 9 Image Processor, with the help of newly developed image processor and the sensor the camera can shoot continuous shots to 8 fps Shooting with AF & ISO 25600. Panasonic G7 also supports 4K video recording at 30/24 fps, Built-In Wi-Fi Connectivity is also there for wireless sharing of files.

References

External links

DMC-G6 on shop.panasonic.com
DMC-G6X on shop.panasonic.com
DMC-G6W on shop.panasonic.com
DMC-G6K on shop.panasonic.com
DMC-G6H on shop.panasonic.com
Panasonic Lumix G6 review

G6